Shri Kala Bhairava Nath Swami Temple is one of the most famous Hindu temples dedicated to lord Bhairava. It is located in the ancient village of Adegaon in Seoni district in the state of Madhya Pradesh, India.

References

Shiva temples in Madhya Pradesh
Seoni district